= Hudaibah =

- Location within United Arab Emirates
- Coordinates: 25°47′47″N 55°58′58″E
- Country: United Arab Emirates
- Emirate: Ras Al Khaimah
- Elevation: 19 m (62 ft)

Hudaibah is a suburb of the city of Ras Al Khaimah, United Arab Emirates (UAE).
